Salalah Sport Club (also known locally as Al-Nimoor, or "The Tiger(s)", or just plainly as Salalah) is an Omani football club based in Salalah, Oman. Their home ground is Al-Saada Stadium, but they also recognize the older Salalah Sports Complex as their home ground. Both stadiums are government owned, but they also own their own personal stadium and sports equipment, as well as their own training facilities.

History
Shortly after the club was promoted to the Omani League, top division of Oman Football Association, it was decided among the club officials that the club's name should be changed to "Salalah" in order to give the club a more distinct name, (rather than being named Al-Hilal, a name which is used by many clubs throughout the Middle East) and in 2010 the name was officially changed to Salalah SC. The club's crest was revealed days before the start of the 2010–11 season.

Being a multisport club
Although being mainly known for their football, Salalah SC like many other clubs in Oman, have not only football in their list, but also hockey, volleyball, handball, basketball, badminton and squash. They also have a youth football team competing in the Omani Youth league.

Colors, kit providers and sponsors
Salalah SC have been known since establishment to wear a full blue kit (usually a lighter shade of blue), varying themselves from neighbors Al-Ittihad (Green), Al-Nasr S.C.S.C. (Blue) and Dhofar S.C.S.C. (Red) kits. They have also had many different sponsors over the years. As of now, Uhlsport provides them with kits.

Honours and achievements

National titles

Oman First Division League (0):
Runners-up  2009-10, 2014-15

References

External links
Salalah SC Profile at Soccerway.com
Salalah SC Profile at Goalzz.com

Football clubs in Oman
Omani League
Salalah
Association football clubs established in 1981
1981 establishments in Oman